= Vexail (musician) =

American singer and rapper (born 2010)

- Born: John Ogbonna; June 23, 2010 (age 16); Norfolk, Virginia
- Origin: Norfolk, Virginia, US
- Genres: Hip-hop; R&B; Pop
- Occupations: Singer; songwriter; rapper; record producer
- Years active: 2022–present

John Ogbonna (born 23 June 2010), popularly known as Vexail (stylized in all caps), is an American singer-songwriter, rapper, and record producer. He started making music at age 13.

== Biography ==
John was born in Norfolk, Virginia and is of Indian, Zulu, and Igbo descent. He spent 3 years of his child in Lagos, Nigeria, and often competed in song challenges on TikTok. His debut single “Bliss” was produced by Sammy SoSo and was originally released in 2026, followed by the lyric video. He won a Grammy award at the 2025 awards ceremony

== Discography ==
=== Singles ===
- 2026, FREE
- 2026, Hypnotized
- 2025, Looser
- 2026, Bliss
- 2026, Trap Em 126
- 2026, Pop Out
- 2026, If you try

=== Production credits ===
- 2025, Rich Flex
- 2023, WAIT FOR U
- 2023, Mr. Morale & The Big Steppers
- 2022, Donda
